San Ramón is a small city in the north of Canelones Department, in southern Uruguay.

San Ramón is also the name of the municipality to which the city belongs.

Geography
It is situated on the south bank of Santa Lucía River, which is the border with Florida Department and south of the hill Cuchilla del Chamizo.

Location
The railroad track Montevideo - Melo / Río Branco (to Brazil) passes through the city.

History
San Ramón was founded as a "(village) in 1867, and on 11 July 1910, its status was elevated to "Villa"  town (pueblo) by the Act of Ley Nº 3.643. On 26 June 1953, its status was further elevated to "Ciudad" (city) by the Act of Ley Nº 11.952.

Population 
In 2011 San Ramón had a population of 7,133. In 2010, the Intendencia de Canelones had estimated a population of 8,123  for the municipality during the elections.

 
Source: Instituto Nacional de Estadística de Uruguay

Places of worship
 St. Raymond Nonnatus Parish Church (Roman Catholic)

Government 
The city mayor as of July 2010 is Beatríz Lamas.

References

External links 

 Map of San Ramón

Populated places in the Canelones Department